Vieux-Moulin may refer to the following places in France:

 Vieux-Moulin, Oise, a commune in the Oise department
 Vieux-Moulin, Vosges, a commune in the Vosges department